Johann Pacista (12 March 1892 – 9 November 1939) was an Austrian footballer. He played in two matches for the Austria national football team in 1920.

References

External links
 

1892 births
1939 deaths
Austrian footballers
Austria international footballers
Place of birth missing
Association footballers not categorized by position